Kallikrein-14 is a protein that in humans is encoded by the KLK14 gene.

Kallikreins are a subgroup of serine proteases having diverse physiological functions. Growing evidence suggests that many kallikreins are implicated in carcinogenesis and some have potential as novel cancer, skin disorders and other disease biomarkers. This gene is one of the fifteen kallikrein subfamily members located in a cluster on chromosome 19. Apart from its common transcript, an additional transcript variant has been described but its difference in function and full length nature has not been determined.

KLK14 displays optimal trypsin-like activity at an alkaline pH of 8.0 and remains active in the pH ranges of 5.0 - 9.0 and is produced as a zymogen, but can function also in a chymotrypsin-like fashion. Activation of KLK14 is mediated by KLK5 and after KLK14 activation, it further amplifies the activity of KLK proteases by a positive feedback loop via cleavage of pro-KLK5, which is a central player in KLK cascade. KLK14 function has not yet been fully elucidated, but its most notable substrate is PAR2. Its activity is inhibited by a wide variety of proteins, like macroglobulins, serpins, and the serine protease inhibitor lympho-epithelial Kazal-type-related inhibitor (LEKTI) and also micro-environmental pH; and single-metal-ion inhibitors of KLKs among others.

References

Further reading

External links 
 The MEROPS online database for peptidases and their inhibitors: S01.029